Paul Frantz (4 July 1915 – 12 November 1995) was a Luxembourgian cyclist. He competed in the individual and team road race events at the 1936 Summer Olympics.

References

External links
 

1915 births
1995 deaths
Luxembourgian male cyclists
Olympic cyclists of Luxembourg
Cyclists at the 1936 Summer Olympics
People from Mamer